The Ivrea Town Hall is the town hall of the city and comune of Ivrea in Italy.

History 
The site where now stands the Palazzo di Città was previously occupied by the De Burgo Hospital, abandoned by 1750.
The building of a new seat for the Comunal Council was then ordained on the 14 March 1741, having the previous one being judged as inadequate. The project of the building was presumably commissioned to engineer and architect Pietro Felice Bruschetti, even though some other sources point the engineer Giovanni Battista Borra as responsible for the planning of the building.
Construction works started on 3 July 1758 and ended in 1761.
Between January and December 2013 the Palazzo experienced a renewal of its main façade and of its grand hall.

Description 
The Palazzo di Città is on the square formally known as "piazza Ferruccio Nazionale" but colloquially referred to as "piazza di Città". The building is a fundamental scenic backdrop within the ceremonial rules of the Carnival of Ivrea.

Gallery

References

External links

Ivrea
Buildings and structures in Ivrea